As-e Jadid (also Romanized as Ās-e Jadīd) is a village in Peyghan Chayi Rural District, in the Central District of Kaleybar County, East Azerbaijan Province, Iran. At the 2006 census, its population was 29, in 8 families.

References 

Populated places in Kaleybar County